Mefford Knoll is a rocky knoll or ledge on the lower west slopes of the Mount Berlin massif, in the Flood Range of Marie Byrd Land, Antarctica. It was mapped by the United States Geological Survey from ground surveys and U.S. Navy air photos, 1959–66, and was named by the Advisory Committee on Antarctic Names for Michael Mefford, a member of the United States Antarctic Research Program team that studied ice sheet dynamics in the area northeast of Byrd Station, 1971–72.

References

Hills of Marie Byrd Land
Flood Range